Pseudopostega parvilineata is a species of moth of the family Opostegidae. It was described by Puplesis and Robinson in 1999. It is known only from Sulawesi Utara in Indonesia.

References

Opostegidae
Moths described in 1999